Monica Niculescu and Vera Zvonareva were the defending champions, but Zvonareva chose not to participate. Niculescu partnered Ana Bogdan, but lost in the first round to Jessika Ponchet and Renata Voráčová.

Oksana Kalashnikova and Marta Kostyuk won the title, defeating Alicia Barnett and Olivia Nicholls in the final, 7–5, 6–1.

Seeds

Draw

Draw

References

External Links
Draw

2022 WTA 125 tournaments